Sharon Dowey (born 1969/1970) is a Scottish Conservative Party politician who has been a Member of the Scottish Parliament (MSP) for the South Scotland region since May 2021.

Early life 
Dowey was born in Girvan and brought up in Maybole. She has lived and worked in Ayrshire all her life.

Before her election to the Parliament, Dowey was a senior manager at the Morrisons supermarket chain, where she had worked since she was 16.

Political career 
At the 2021 Scottish Parliament election. Dowey stood in the Carrick, Cumnock and Doon Valley constituency, where she came second to Elena Whitham of the Scottish National Party (SNP). She achieved 30.6% of the vote, a +6.4% increase for the Scottish Conservative Party from the previous Scottish Parliament Election in 2016. She was subsequently elected on the South Scotland regional list.

On 12 January 2022, Dowey called for Boris Johnson to resign as Conservative party leader and Prime Minister over the Westminster lockdown parties controversy along with a majority of Scottish Conservative MSPs.

Personal life 
Dowey is married to Martin, a former police officer and the current Conservative Group Leader on South Ayrshire Council. They have three children.

References

External links
 
South Ayrshire Conservatives: Sharon Dowey

Year of birth missing (living people)
Living people
People from Maybole
Conservative MSPs
Members of the Scottish Parliament 2021–2026
Female members of the Scottish Parliament
21st-century British women politicians